This is a list of notable alumni and faculty of the Rashtrasant Tukadoji Maharaj Nagpur University.

Notable alumni

Academia, Science and Technology 

 B. D. Kulkarni, chemical reaction engineer, Shanti Swarup Bhatnagar Prize recipient
 Damaraju Raghavarao, Indian-born statistician known for his contributions in design of experiments
 Dipshikha Chakravortty, microbiologist, N-Bios laureate
 Prafullachandra Vishnu Sane, molecular biologist, Shanti Swarup Bhatnagar Prize recipient
 Ramesh Jain, scientist, professor and entrepreneur in the field of Computer Science
 Shekhar C. Mande, Shanti Swaroop Bhatnagar award-winning scientist in the field of x-ray crystallography and biophysics

Arts and Literature 

 Dhanashree Halbe, translator, poet, and children's author
 Eknath Easwaran, internationally known & respected spiritual teacher
 Harishankar Parsai (1924–1995), noted Hindi writer and satirist
 Indra Bahadur Khare (16 Dec 1922 – 13 April 1953), Hindi Poet and writer
 Vishnu Bhikaji Kolte (1908–1998), noted Marathi writer and former Vice Chancellor, Nagpur University

Business and Law 

 Chandrashekhar Shankar Dharmadhikari, Padma Bhushan, Judge and Indian Independence activist
 Madhukar Narhar Chandurkar, Chief Justice of Indian High Courts
 Justice Mohammad Hidayatullah, Vice President of India & Former Chief Justice of India
 Justice Sharad Arvind Bobde, 47th Chief Justice of India
 Wasudev Waman Patankar advocate, noted Marathi Shayari writer
 Harish Salve Former Solicitor General of India

Athletics and Sports 

 Umesh Yadav, a cricketer who currently plays for Vidarbha cricket team, Indian national team and Royal Challengers Bangalore in the Indian Premier League

Film, Television and Theater 
 Sonu Sood, Bollywood film actor
 Ulhas Kashalkar (b. 1955), noted Hindustani classical vocalist
 Ashish Dixit Indian Film/ Television Actor.

Politics 

 Datta Meghe, MP
 Devendra Fadnavis, Chief Minister of Maharashtra
 Jogendra Kawade, Member of parliament and Maharashtra Legislative Council
 Marotrao Kowase, MP from Gadchiroli-Chimur
 Mukul Wasnik, General Secretary, Indian National Congress, and Union Minister
 Nitin Gadkari, MP from Nagpur and Union minister
 P. V. Narasimha Rao, Former Prime Minister of India
 Shantaram Potdukhe, former Member of Parliament & Union Minister of State, finance
 Shrikant Jichkar, former member of the Indian National Congress
 Swati Dandekar, United States politician, Iowa House of Representatives
 Vilas Muttemwar, former MP from Nagpur

Miscellaneous 

 Eknath Ranade, founder of Vivekananda Kendra
 K. Jayakumar, senior Indian Administrative Service (IAS) officer from Kerala
 Ryder Devapriam, former bishop of the Nandyal Diocese the Church of South India
 Amit Telang, Diplomat, a senior Indian Foreign Service officer and alumni of Government Medical College, Nagpur
 A. K. Dave, I.P., Director of Aviation Research Centre, later founder CEO of ITC Welcom Hotels, CMD of ITDC & Ashok Group of hotels

References

Education in Nagpur
Nagpur University people